Camponotus prostans is a species of ant in the genus Camponotus. Described by Forel in 1910, the species is restricted to Western Australia.

See also
List of ants of Australia
List of Camponotus species''

References

prostans
Hymenoptera of Australia
Insects described in 1910